Glenalta is a suburb located in the south eastern Foothills of the Mount Lofty Ranges of Adelaide, South Australia. It is adjacent to Belair National Park.

In 2009, demographer Bernard Salt of the Sunday Mail judged Glenalta to be Adelaide's most liveable suburb, citing its "affordability, access and ambience".

History
The first European settlers in the area of Glenalta arrived in the 1840s, with the area named "Blackwood Vale Farm". The name Glenalta is derived from "glen" (valley) and "alta" (high), hence meaning 'a valley near a hill'. In 1869, the Blackwood Inn (renamed the Belair Hotel in 1880) was opened by Robert Burfield, one of the earlier settlers in the area and a trustee of the Inebriates Retreat in nearby Belair. The suburb was initially divided in 62 allotments in 1926, then subdivided further in the 1950s and 1960s.

Transport
The suburb is served by Glenalta railway station on the Belair line.

References

Suburbs of Adelaide